Mugi Rekso Abadi (MRA) is an Indonesian holding company with units in magazine publishing, luxury retail brands, hotels and restaurants, radio stations, and automotive companies. Founded in 1993, MRA Group is based in Jakarta.

History and founders
In 1993, MRA was founded by Soetikno Soedarjo, Adiguna Sutowo and Soetikno's then-wife Dian Muljadi Soedarjo (the daughter of pharmaceuticals tycoon Kartini Muljadi). The name Mugi Rekso Abadi is Javanese for "I hope it lasts forever". MRA was pre-dated by the establishment of Hard Rock Cafe Jakarta, which Adiguna and Soetikno had launched with an investment of 8 billion rupiah in 1992. The idea for Hard Rock Cafe Jakarta came from a conversation between Adiguna, Soetikno and Meuthia Kasim. Once MRA was established as a holding company, Soetikno later invested in a broadcast media division, creating Hard Rock FM Jakarta, followed by Hard Rock FM Bandung, and Hard Rock Radio Bali, i-Radio, MTV Radio, O Channel, and IP Entertainment. MRA also expanded into lifestyle magazines, imported luxury cars and restaurants. 

MRA's website states: "Leading the drive at MRA are energetic, dedicated executives, exemplified by Adiguna Sutowo & Soetikno Soedarjo.
They embody the character of an excellent young management team: a sense of intelligent restlessness, they are on the move and look forward to new products, new concepts and fresh horizons." Adiguna was in 2005 sentenced to seven years in jail for murdering a waiter at Jakarta Hilton International hotel, and Soetikno was in 2020 sentenced to six years in jail for bribery.

In January 2017, Adiguna's son, Maulana Indraguna Sutowo, was appointed chief executive officer to replace Soetikno, who had been named a corruption suspect. The three daughters of co-founders Soetikno Soedarjo and Dian Muljadi - Putri, Mita and Dita Soedarjo - all hold senior positions in MRA Group.

Divisions 
MRA has six divisions: Print Media, Broadcast Media, Retail & Lifestyle, Food & Beverage, Automotive, Hotel & Property.

Print media 
Soetikno Soedarjo launched an Indonesian version of Cosmopolitan Magazine in August 1997. Indonesian versions of other international lifestyle magazines followed, although several ceased their print editions in 2017.

Current magazines
 Cosmopolitan Indonesia
 Harper's Bazaar Indonesia (since January 2000)
 Mother & Beyond
 CASA Indonesia (published since 2008 as Bravacasa, later renamed CASA)
 Her World Indonesia

Defunct magazines

MRA Group had a magazine distribution unit within the circulation department of PT Higina Alhadin, the publisher of Cosmopolitan Indonesia. It functioned to distribute publications owned by MRA Group. In 2003, the circulation department became a limited corporation called PT Citra Distribusi Mandiri (CDM), which distributed publications owned by MRA and other publishers.

Broadcast media 
MRA Group's first media unit was Hard Rock FM, established in 1996. The success of Hard Rock FM led to the creation of I-Radio and TRAX FM, followed by Cosmopolitan FM in 2002.

MRA Group's radio station subsidiaries include:

Retail and lifestyle

Current brands
 Bulgari (Italian jewelry chain, established in Indonesia in 1995 under PT Mogems Putri International)
 Bang & Olufsen (electronics chain, brought to Indonesia under PT Sarana Elektrindo Utama in July 2001)

Putri Soedarjo, the eldest daughter of Soetikno Soedarjo and Dian Muljadi, is head of retail for Bulgari and Bang & Olufsen.

Previous brands
 Paris Hilton Handbags & Accessories (launched under PT Pesona Harumi, now defunct)
 Ghiboo (lifestyle web portal launched in 2013, now defunct)

Food and beverage
MRA Group's first enterprise was Hard Rock Cafe Jakarta. It was originally located in Sarinah shopping center. In July 2004, it relocated to Plaza Indonesia’s Entertainment X'nter. In August 2013, it moved to Pacific Place mall in the Sudirman City Business District. As of 2020, MRA Group runs the following restaurants:

 Hard Rock Cafe Jakarta
 Hard Rock Cafe Bali
 Lalla Jakarta 
 Cloud Lounge & Dining (rooftop bar in The Plaza Office Tower, Jakarta, since 2014)
 RTL (Regional Tasting Lounge, a restaurant in Capital Place on Jakarta's Jalan Gatot Subroto)
 
MRA also has a subsidiary that runs Indonesian outlets of Häagen Dazs. The unit has since 2015 been run by Dita Soedarjo, the youngest daughter of Soetikno Soedarjo and Dian Muljadi.

Automotive
MRA has brought some of world's top luxury car brands to Indonesia, but high government taxes on luxury vehicles and an unfavorable exchange rate have resulted in the importing licenses for some brands not being renewed.

Current brands
 Ferrari: Ferrari Jakarta (PT Citra Langgeng Otomotif) was established in 2001 and is the official distributor for Ferrari in Indonesia.

Previous brands
 Harley Davidson: PT Mabua Harley-Davidson was founded on 13 June 1997 as part of MRA. The sole dealer of Harley-Davidson motorcycles in Indonesia, its agency license expired on 31 December 2015 and was not renewed because of the weakening of the rupiah and government tax increases.
 Maserati: Maserati was introduced to Indonesia in 2001, initially under the same company as Ferrari. From 2012, Maserati Indonesia was run by MRA subsidiary PT Tiara Cahaya Otomotif as importer and PT Citra Gemilang Otomotif as authorized dealer. In 2014, Maserati appointed PT Auto Trisula Indonesia as its new partner for Indonesia.
 Abarth: Since 2013, the Abarth sales license in Indonesia was held by PT Parama Unggul Automotive and MRA Group subsidiary PT Genta Surya Automotive (GSO). The license expired in January 2016 and was not renewed, but the Abarth showroom on Jalan Fatmawati in South Jakarta continued to offer services.

Hotel & Property 
 Bulgari Hotel & Resort (luxury cliff-top resort in Uluwatu, Bali)

References 

Indonesian companies established in 1993
Mass media companies of Indonesia
Mass media companies established in 1993